The Joseph Regenstein Library, often referred to by students as "The Reg," is the main library of the University of Chicago, named after industrialist and philanthropist Joseph Regenstein. It is one of the largest repositories of books in the world and is noted for its brutalist architecture.

History

The library stands on the former grounds of Stagg Field. In 1965, the Joseph Regenstein Foundation gave $10 million to the University for construction of the library.  In 1968, the university broke ground and, in 1970, the library opened at the final cost of $20,750,000.  The building was designed by the Chicago firm Skidmore, Owings & Merrill led by senior architect Walter Netsch. It is built out of grooved limestone, which, from a distance, resembles concrete. University tour guides often remark on the resemblance between each of the elements of the building's facade and the fore edge of a book. The University of Chicago Graduate Library School was housed in the Joseph Regenstein Library until its closure. Today, the "Reg" is the flagship institution of The University of Chicago Library system, which is considered among the top five in the world for breadth and depth of material, and receives high marks from users (The Princeton Review placed it in the top nine for college students).

The building has five floors above ground and two basements. Each floor has a large reading room in the center with desks, group study rooms, lockers and shelved reference works. The reading room on floors two and three is connected by a small atrium. The reading rooms are separated from the stacks, located on the west side of the building, so that the stacks can be maintained at lower temperatures, which are more amicable to book conservation. 220 faculty studies line the east side of the building.

The Regenstein's overflowing collection posed space problems for the book stacks. In May 2005, the University of Chicago's Board of Trustees authorized funding for a $42 million addition to the library, which was completed mid-2011. The Joe and Rika Mansueto Library, designed by Chicago-based architect Helmut Jahn, consists of a glass-domed reading room, under which lies an automated storage and retrieval system stretching fifty feet underground. It allows the library to maintain physical copies of materials available online while creating space within the book stacks to accommodate approximately 20 years of new print acquisitions.

The Regenstein Library is a popular social space for the University of Chicago college students: "On our campus, it's not the football game that draws the biggest crowd, it's evening study in the library," said former Provost Richard Saller. "We're a campus where the library is sort of the social center because it is the focus [of the university]."

The Regenstein Library is also the location of the Special Collections Research Center, which houses rare book collections, manuscripts, and university archives.  The SCRC was established in 1953 by Herman H. Fussler and was moved to the "Reg" when it opened in 1970.  The rare books collection currently holds approximately 265,000 volumes.

Figures

Area: 577,085 gross feet2.
Maximum east-west dimension: 344'.
Maximum north-south dimension: 411'6".

References

External links

https://www.lib.uchicago.edu/e/reg/using/building.html
http://www-news.uchicago.edu/citations/05/050605.reg-ct.html
https://www.lib.uchicago.edu/e/scrc/

Library buildings completed in 1970
Brutalist architecture in Illinois
Skidmore, Owings & Merrill buildings
University of Chicago Library
Libraries in Chicago